The House of Hanover, whose members are known as Hanoverians, is a European royal house of German origin that ruled Hanover, Great Britain, and Ireland at various times during the 17th to 20th centuries. The house originated in 1635 as a cadet branch of the House of Brunswick-Lüneburg, growing in prestige until Hanover became an Electorate in 1692. George I became the first Hanoverian monarch of Great Britain and Ireland in 1714. At Queen Victoria's death in 1901, the throne of the United Kingdom passed to her eldest son Edward VII, a member of the House of Saxe-Coburg and Gotha. The last reigning members of the House lost the Duchy of Brunswick in 1918 when Germany became a republic.

The formal name of the house was the House of Brunswick-Lüneburg, Hanover line. The senior line of Brunswick-Lüneburg, which ruled Brunswick-Wolfenbüttel, became extinct in 1884. The House of Hanover is now the only surviving branch of the House of Welf, which is the senior branch of the House of Este. The current head of the House of Hanover is Ernst August, Prince of Hanover.

History

Dukes and Electors of Brunswick-Lüneburg
George, Duke of Brunswick-Lüneburg was the first member of the House of Hanover. When the Duchy of Brunswick-Lüneburg was divided in 1635, George inherited the Principality of Calenberg and moved his residence to Hanover. His son, Christian Louis, inherited the Principality of Lüneburg from George's brother. Calenberg and Lüneburg were then shared between George's sons until united in 1705 under his grandson, also called George, who subsequently became George I of Great Britain. All held the title Duke of Brunswick-Lüneburg. George died in 1641 and was succeeded by:
 Christian Louis, 1st son of Duke George, Prince of Calenberg (1641–1648) and Prince of Lüneburg (1648–1665). He relinquished Calenburg when he became Prince of Lüneburg.
 George William, 2nd son of Duke George, Prince of Calenberg (1648–1665) and Prince of Lüneburg (1665–1705). He relinquished Calenburg when he became Prince of Lüneburg on the death of his brother, Christian Louis.
 John Frederick, 3rd son of Duke George, Prince of Calenberg (1665–1679).
 Ernest Augustus, 4th son of Duke George, Prince of Calenberg (1679–1698). He became Prince of Calenberg on the death of his brother John Frederick. He was elevated to prince-elector of the Holy Roman Empire in 1692. Ernest Augustus's wife, Sophia of the Palatinate, was declared heiress of the throne of England by the Act of Settlement of 1701, which decreed Roman Catholics could not accede to the throne. Sophia was at that time the senior eligible Protestant descendant of James I of England.
 George Louis, son of Duke Ernest Augustus and Sophia, became Elector and Prince of Calenberg in 1698 and Prince of Lüneburg when his uncle George William died in 1705. He inherited his mother's claim to the throne of Great Britain when she died in 1714.

Monarchs of Great Britain, Ireland, and Hanover 

George Louis became the first British monarch of the House of Hanover as George I in 1714. The dynasty provided six British monarchs:

Of the Kingdoms of Great Britain and Ireland (changed in 1801 to the United Kingdom of Great Britain and Ireland):
 George I ( 1714–1727) (Georg Ludwig = George Louis)
 George II ( 1727–1760) (Georg August = George Augustus)
 George III ( 1760–1820)
 George IV ( 1820–1830)
 William IV ( 1830–1837)
 Victoria ( 1837–1901).

George I, George II, and George III also served as electors and dukes of Brunswick-Lüneburg, informally, Electors of Hanover (cf. personal union).

From 1814, when Hanover became a kingdom, the British monarch was also King of Hanover.

Upon the death of William IV in 1837, the personal union of the thrones of the United Kingdom and Hanover ended. Succession to the Hanoverian throne was regulated by semi-Salic law (agnatic-cognatic), which gave priority to all male lines before female lines, so that it passed not to Queen Victoria but to her uncle, the Duke of Cumberland. In 1901, when Queen Victoria, the last British monarch provided by the House of Hanover, died, her son and heir Edward VII became the first British Monarch of the House of Saxe-Coburg and Gotha, Edward taking his family name from that of his father, Prince Albert of Saxe-Coburg-Gotha.

Kings of Hanover after the breakup of the personal union

After the death of William IV in 1837, the following kings of Hanover continued the dynasty:

 Ernest Augustus, King of Hanover (r. 1837–1851)
 George V (r. 1851–1866, deposed)

The Kingdom of Hanover ended in 1866 when it was annexed by the Kingdom of Prussia and the King of Hanover (and Duke of Cumberland) was forced to go into exile in Austria. The 1866 rift between the houses of Hanover and Hohenzollern was settled by the 1913 marriage of Princess Viktoria Luise of Prussia to Ernest Augustus, Duke of Brunswick, the last king's grandson.

Prince-bishops of Osnabrück 
At the end of the Thirty Years' War, the Peace of Westphalia (1648) awarded the Prince-Bishopric of Osnabrück alternately to a Catholic bishop and to a cadet branch of Brunswick-Lüneburg. Since the treaty gave cadets priority over heirs and reigning princes, Osnabrück became a form of appanage (in alternation) of the House of Hanover.

 Ernest Augustus, Elector of Brunswick-Lüneburg (r. 1662–1698), fourth son of George, Duke of Brunswick-Lüneburg
 Ernest Augustus, Duke of York and Albany (r. 1715–1728), sixth son of Ernest Augustus, Elector of Brunswick-Lüneburg
 Prince Frederick, Duke of York and Albany (r. 1764–1802), second son of George III

Osnabrück was mediatized to Hanover in 1803.

Dukes of Brunswick 
In 1884, the senior branch of the House of Welf became extinct. By semi-Salic law, the House of Hanover would have acceded to the Duchy of Brunswick, but there had been strong Prussian pressure against having George V of Hanover or his son, the Duke of Cumberland, succeed to a member state of the German Empire, at least without strong conditions, including swearing to the German constitution. By a law of 1879, the Duchy of Brunswick established a temporary council of regency to take over at the Duke's death, and if necessary appoint a regent.

The Duke of Cumberland proclaimed himself Duke of Brunswick at the Duke's death, and lengthy negotiations ensued, but were never resolved. Prince Albert of Prussia was appointed regent; after his death in 1906, Duke John Albert of Mecklenburg succeeded him. The Duke of Cumberland's eldest son died in a car accident in 1912; the father renounced Brunswick in favor of his younger son Ernest Augustus, who married the Kaiser's daughter Victoria Louise the same year, swore allegiance to the German Empire, and was allowed to ascend the throne of the Duchy in November 1913. He was a major-general during the First World War; but he was overthrown as Duke of Brunswick in 1918. His father was also deprived of his British titles in 1919, for "bearing arms against Great Britain".

After having left Brunswick Palace, the duke and his family moved back to their exile seat Cumberland Castle at Gmunden, Austria, but in 1924 he received Blankenburg Castle and some other estates in a settlement with the Free State of Brunswick, and moved there in 1930. A few days before Blankenburg was handed over to the Red Army by British and US forces in late 1945, to become part of East Germany, the family was able to quickly move to Marienburg Castle (Hanover) with all their furniture, transported by British army trucks, on the order of King George VI. Duke Ernest Augustus died at Marienburg Castle in 1953. His Herrenhausen Palace in Hanover had been completely destroyed during World War II. His eldest son, Prince Ernest Augustus, sold his remaining property at Herrenhausen Gardens in 1961, but kept the nearby Princely House, a small palace built in 1720 by George I for his daughter Anna Louise. It is now his grandson Ernest Augustus's private home, along with Marienburg Castle.

Claimants 

The later heads of the House of Hanover have been:
 George V (1866–1878)
 Ernest Augustus, Crown Prince of Hanover, 3rd Duke of Cumberland and Teviotdale (1878–1923)
 Ernest Augustus, Duke of Brunswick (1923–1953), son of the previous
 Ernest Augustus, Prince of Hanover (1953–1987)
 Ernest Augustus, Prince of Hanover (1987–present)
 Ernest Augustus, Hereditary Prince of Hanover (heir apparent)

The family has been resident in Austria since 1866 and thus took on Austrian nationality besides their German and British. Since the later king Ernest Augustus had been created Duke of Cumberland and Teviotdale and Earl of Armagh by his father George III in 1799, these British peerages were inherited by his descendants. In 1914 the title of a Prince of Great Britain and Ireland was additionally granted to the members of the house by King George V. These peerages and titles however were suspended under the Titles Deprivation Act 1917. However, the title Royal Prince of Great Britain and Ireland had been entered into the family's German passports, together with the German titles, in 1914. After the German Revolution of 1918–19, with the abolishment of nobility's privileges, titles officially became parts of the last name. So, curiously, the British prince's title is still part of the family's last name in their German passports, while it is no longer mentioned in their British documents.

On 29 August 1931, Ernest Augustus, Duke of Brunswick, as head of the House of Hanover, declared the formal resumption, for himself and his dynastic descendants, of use of his former British princely title as a secondary title of pretense, which style, "Royal Prince of Great Britain and Ireland", his grandson, the current head of the house, also called Ernest Augustus, continues to claim. He has the right to petition under the Titles Deprivation Act 1917 for the restoration of his ancestors' suspended British peerages Duke of Cumberland and Teviotdale and Earl of Armagh, but he has not done so. His father, another Ernest Augustus, did, however, successfully claim British nationality after World War II by virtue of a hitherto overlooked (and since repealed) provision of the Sophia Naturalization Act 1705. According to the decision taken by a court of the House of Lords, all family members bear the last name Guelph in the UK and are styled Royal Highnesses in their documents.

List of members

Patrilineal descent 
 Oberto I, 912–975
 Oberto Obizzo, 940–1017
 Albert Azzo I, Margrave of Milan, 970–1029
 Albert Azzo II, Margrave of Milan, died 997 or 1009
 Welf I, Duke of Bavaria, 1037–1101
 Henry IX, Duke of Bavaria, 1074–1126
 Henry X, Duke of Bavaria, 1108–1139
 Henry the Lion, 1129–1195
 William of Winchester, Lord of Lunenburg, 1184–1213
 Otto I, Duke of Brunswick-Lüneburg, 1204–1252
 Albert I, Duke of Brunswick-Lüneburg, 1236–1279
 Albert II, Duke of Brunswick-Lüneburg, 1268–1318
 Magnus the Pious, Duke of Brunswick-Lüneburg, 1304–1369
 Magnus II, Duke of Brunswick-Lüneburg, 1328–1373
 Bernard I, Duke of Brunswick-Lüneburg, 1362–1434
 Frederick II, Duke of Brunswick-Lüneburg, 1408–1478
 Otto V, Duke of Brunswick-Lüneburg, 1439–1471
 Heinrich, Duke of Brunswick-Lüneburg, 1468–1532
 Ernest I, Duke of Brunswick-Lüneburg, 1497–1546
 William, Duke of Brunswick-Lüneburg, 1535–1592
 George, Duke of Brunswick-Lüneburg, 1582–1641
 Ernest Augustus, Elector of Hanover, 1629–1698
 George I of Great Britain, 1660–1727
 George II of Great Britain, 1683–1760
 Frederick, Prince of Wales, 1707–1751
 George III of the United Kingdom, 1738–1820
 Ernest Augustus, King of Hanover, 1771–1851
 George V of Hanover, 1819–1878
 Ernest Augustus, Crown Prince of Hanover, 1845–1923
 Ernest Augustus, Duke of Brunswick, 1887–1953
 Ernest Augustus, Prince of Hanover, 1914–1987
 Ernst August, Prince of Hanover, b. 1954
 Prince Ernest Augustus of Hanover, b. 1983

Legacy 
Many towns and provinces across the British Empire were named after the ruling House of Hanover and its members.  They include the U.S. state of Georgia, U.S. towns Hanover, Massachusetts; Hanover, New Hampshire; Hanover, Pennsylvania; Hanover Township, Jo Daviess County, Illinois, counties Hanover County, Virginia; Caroline County, Virginia; Brunswick County, Virginia; New Hanover County, North Carolina; Brunswick County, North Carolina; King George County, Virginia, places named Georgia in New Jersey (e.g. New Brunswick, NJ), Vermont, Arkansas and South Dakota, seven towns in the U.S. and Canada named after Queen Charlotte.  Furthermore the Canadian province of New Brunswick and towns Hanover, Ontario, Guelph; Ontario, and Victoria, British Columbia; in South Africa the town Hanover, Northern Cape, in Australia the state Victoria (Australia) and the city Adelaide, in the UK six and in the US thirteen towns named Brunswick.  Furthermore one each in Australia and New Zealand, and worldwide more than fifty towns named Victoria. There are also numerous streets and squares, such as Hanover Square, Westminster, Hanover Square (Manhattan), Hanover Square, Syracuse or Queen Street, Brisbane with its intersections named after members of the House.

Georgian architecture gives distinction to the architectural styles current between 1714 and 1830 in most English-speaking countries.

See also 
 Family tree of the Hanoverian British monarchs
 Georgian era for kings George I, II, III, IV
 History of Hanover

Explanatory notes

References

Further reading

Historiography 
 Bultmann, William A. "Early Hanoverian England (1714–1760): Some Recent Writings," in Elizabeth Chapin Furber, ed. Changing views on British history: essays on historical writing since 1939 (Harvard University Press, 1966), pp 181–205
 
 Snyder, Henry L. "Early Georgian England," in Richard Schlatter, ed., Recent Views on British History: Essays on Historical Writing since 1966 (Rutgers UP, 1984), pp. 167–196, historiography

External links 

  Official website of the House of Welf
 Succession laws in the House of Welf
 British German Royal Heritage Route 2014
 House of Hanover Archive.org
 British Hanoverian Family tree

 
Germany–United Kingdom relations
European royal families
History of Hanover (region)
New Hanover County, North Carolina
Royal houses of Britain